Vargeão is a municipality in the state of Santa Catarina in the South region of Brazil. The town is located on the southern rim of an impact crater, the Vargeão Dome. Vargeão's city hall is located inside the crater. The local population is well aware of the impact origin of the structure, to the point that the town's official nickname is Meteor City (Terra do Meteorro).

See also
List of municipalities in Santa Catarina

References

Municipalities in Santa Catarina (state)